Molly Ball is an American political journalist and writer.  She is the national political correspondent for Time magazine.  She is the author of a 2020 biography of House Speaker Nancy Pelosi.

Early life and education 
Ball was raised in Colorado and Idaho. She attended Cherry Creek High School in a Denver suburb, graduating in 1997. She graduated from Yale University in 2001.

Career 
Ball joined Time as National Political Correspondent in 2017. Previously, she covered U.S. politics for The Atlantic, where she won the 2012 Toner Prize for Excellence in Public Reporting for her coverage of the 2012 United States elections, including the 2012 United States presidential election and the 2012 gay marriage referendums.  She has been a reporter for Politico, the Las Vegas Review-Journal and the Las Vegas Sun.

Recognition 
In 2019,  Ball received the Gerald R. Ford Prize for Distinguished Reporting on the Presidency for her coverage of the Trump administration. Other awards she has received include the Lee Walczak Award for Political Analysis, the Sandy Hume Memorial Award for Excellence in Political Journalism, the Society of Professional Journalists' Sigma Delta Chi Award, and the Toner Prize for Excellence in Political Reporting. Ball received the 2020 Everett McKinley Dirksen Award for Distinguished Reporting of Congress from the National Press Foundation for her reporting on House Speaker Nancy Pelosi, which judges called "authoritative," "compelling" and "nuanced." She was honored as Outstanding Journalist in Print in the 2020 Washington Women in Journalism awards.

Personal life 
Ball is of Jewish heritage. She lives in Arlington, Virginia with her husband and three children.

In 2007, she won $100,000 on the game show Who Wants to Be a Millionaire.

References

External links
Official Website

American political writers
Time (magazine) people
The Atlantic (magazine) people
Politico people
Yale University alumni
21st-century American women writers
American women journalists
Year of birth missing (living people)
Living people
21st-century American journalists
American women non-fiction writers
21st-century American non-fiction writers
Women political writers
Journalists from Colorado
Journalists from Idaho
Jewish American journalists
21st-century American Jews